Allocasuarina drummondiana is a shrub of the genus Allocasuarina native to the Wheatbelt region of Western Australia.

It produces red-brown flowers from July to September and is found in sandy or gravelly lateritic soils.

The species was first described as Casuarina drummondiana by the botanist Friedrich Anton Wilhelm Miquel in 1848 in the Revisio critica Casuarinarum. It was subsequently reclassified into the Allocasuarina genera by Lawrence Alexander Sidney Johnson in 1982 in a revision of the sheoaks, Notes on Casuarinaceae II., published in the Journal of the Adelaide Botanic Gardens.

References

drummondiana
Rosids of Western Australia
Fagales of Australia
Plants described in 1982
Dioecious plants